Jihad "Naji" Keyrouz (4 April 1960 – 4 February 2019) was a Lebanese judoka. He competed in the men's extra-Lightweight event at the 1980 Summer Olympics.

References

1960 births
2019 deaths
Lebanese male judoka
Olympic judoka of Lebanon
Judoka at the 1980 Summer Olympics